Elica S.p.A. is an Italian company established in 1970 that designs and manufactures kitchen hoods, induction hobs, and boilers.

Elicia is chaired by Francesco Casoli and led by CEO Antonio Recinella, it has been listed since 2006 at the Stock Exchange of Milan.

History 
Elica was founded by Ermanno Casoli in Fabriano in 1970. After Ermanno died of a heart attack in 1978, leadership passed first to his wife, and then to his son, Francesco.

Over the years, through acquisitions and a focus on design, the company grew to operate seven factories in Italy, Poland, Mexico, India and China with a production of over 21 million hoods.

In June 2018, the company sold 33% of Elica India to Whirlpool of India.

Economic data 
As of 31 December 2013, the Elica group had a consolidated turnover of around €391.8 million and a consolidated net profit of around €1.4 million.

In 2017, revenues reached €479.3 million, an increase of 9.1% compared to the previous year. Elica group consists of approximately 4,800 employees.

See also 

 List of Italian companies

References

External links 
 

Cooking appliance brands
Home appliance brands
Home appliance manufacturers of Italy
Italian companies established in 1970
Italian brands
Manufacturing companies established in 1970
Privately held companies of Italy
Companies based in le Marche
Fabriano